The NAIA Men's Tennis Championship is the annual tournament to determine the national champions of men's NAIA collegiate tennis in the United States and Canada. Held annually since 1966, three separate championships are contested: team, singles, and doubles.

The most successful program has been Redlands, with 10 NAIA national titles (Redlands has subsequently joined the NCAA).

The current champions are Georgia Gwinnett, who won their eighth national title in 2022.

Results

Singles, Doubles, and Team titles (1952–1999)

Team title only (2000–present)

Champions

Team titles

Singles titles

Doubles titles

 Schools highlighted in pink are closed or no longer sponsor athletics.
 Schools highlight in yellow have reclassified athletics from the NAIA.

See also
NAIA Women's Tennis Championship
NCAA Men's Tennis Championships (Division I, Division II, Division III)
NCAA Women's Tennis Championships (Division I, Division II, Division III)

References

External links
NAIA Men's Tennis

Tennis men's
Tennis tournaments in the United States
College tennis in the United States